Senecio triangularis, known as arrowleaf ragwort, arrowleaf groundsel and arrowleaf butterweed, is a species of the genus Senecio and family Asteraceae.

Description
	

It is similar in form to Senecio serra, both being four feet tall, have narrow and serrated leaves, and are topped with many small, yellow sunflowers. but S. triangularis is more common than S. serra. The stems have evenly distributed leaves. The leaves are triangular, with tapered ends, hence the name. 
 
As some plants are diploid, meaning having two sets of chromosomes, this can be used to identify hybrids and classification of groupings. It has been counted as 2n = 40, 80.

It is native to temperate regions of America and is reportedly poisonous to animals.

Taxonomy
It has the common names of arrowleaf ragwort, arrowleaf groundsel, and arrowleaf butterweed.

In the early 1830s, Scottish botanist Thomas Drummond collected this plant, probably on his second trip to the United States.  The plant was named by William Hooker, Drummond's mentor, and first published and described by Hooker in 'Flora Boreali-Americana' (Fl. Bor.-Amer.) Vol.1 on page 332 in 1834.

Distribution
Native
Nearctic:
Subarctic America: Northwest Territory, Yukon Territory, Alaska
Western Canada: Alberta, British Columbia
Northwestern United States: Colorado, Idaho, Montana, Oregon, Washington, Wyoming
Southwestern United States: Arizona, California, Nevada, Utah, New Mexico
Source: GRIN,

Habitat
It grows in open woodlands, (mainly coniferous forests) and on rocky stream sides.

References

External links

triangularis
Alpine flora
Flora of Subarctic America
Flora of Western Canada
Flora of the Northwestern United States
Flora of the West Coast of the United States
Flora of the Southwestern United States
Flora of the Sierra Nevada (United States)
Flora of the Rocky Mountains
Flora without expected TNC conservation status